Ian Dalziel is a Scottish geologist who pioneered the study of pre-Pangaea plate tectonics and the theory of supercontinent cycles on Earth. In particular, he is known for geologic fieldwork in the southern Andes, the Scotia Arc, South Georgia and Antarctica. His discoveries include evidence for the timing of the separation of South America from Antarctica and the beginning of the Antarctic Circumpolar Current.

In 2021, Dalziel was awarded the Penrose Medal by the Geological Society of America.

Biography

Early life
Ian Dalziel was born 26 November 1937, in Glasgow, Scotland where he lived with his actor parents before moving to the University of Edinburgh, where he earned a B.Sc. and later a Ph.D. in geology. As a child, Dalziel gained an early appreciation of geology and remote places while on holiday in the highlands and islands of Scotland with his actor parents.

Academic career
After a short stint lecturing geology at University of Edinburgh, Dalziel moved to the U.S. to join the University of Wisconsin as assistant professor in 1963. Just a few years later, in 1967, he joined Columbia University as associate professor then later senior research scientist at Columbia University's Lamont-Doherty Geological Observatory (now the Lamont–Doherty Earth Observatory). In 1985, he made the move to Austin, Texas, to join the University of Texas at Austin Institute for Geophysics, where he is now Research Professor.

Recognition
In 2021, Dalziel was awarded the Penrose Medal by the Geological Society of America for pioneering discoveries about Earth’s ancient geography and its past supercontinents. The Penrose Medal is considered the highest honor to be awarded within the field of geology. At the award ceremony, Dalziel was recognized as "one of the great field-based geologists of our generation" and "one of the world’s leading geologists."

References

1937 births
Living people
21st-century British geologists
Scottish geologists